Rob Hanning is an American producer and writer.

Writing credits
Castle
Detroit 1-8-7
Courting Alex
8 Simple Rules For Dating My Teenage Daughter
Malcolm in the Middle
Frasier
Men Behaving Badly
Class of '96
Townies (Story Editor)

Producing credits
Castle (consulting producer)
Detroit 1-8-7 (consulting producer)
Courting Alex (executive producer)  
8 Simple Rules For Dating My Teenage Daughter (co-executive producer)
Hope & Faith (executive producer) 
Malcolm in the Middle (co-executive producer) 
Frasier (co-executive producer)

Awards and nominations
Hanning had been nominated for two Primetime Emmys.

References

External links

American television writers
American male television writers
American television producers
Living people
Place of birth missing (living people)
Year of birth missing (living people)